Markus Gier (born 1 January 1970) is a Swiss competition rower and Olympic champion. He hails from Sankt Gallen.

Gier and his brother Michael won a gold medal in lightweight double sculls at the 1996 Summer Olympics. The brothers also competed at the 2000 Summer Olympics in Sydney where they finished fifth.

He was in the silver medal-winning lightweight quad scull in Bled in 1989 along with Reto Fierz (bow), Philipp Ferlber (seat 2), and Cirillo Ghielmetti (seat 3).

References

1970 births
Living people
Swiss male rowers
Olympic rowers of Switzerland
Rowers at the 1996 Summer Olympics
Rowers at the 2000 Summer Olympics
Olympic gold medalists for Switzerland
Olympic medalists in rowing
Medalists at the 1996 Summer Olympics
World Rowing Championships medalists for Switzerland
Sportspeople from St. Gallen (city)